Samuel Piette (born 12 November 1994) is a Canadian professional soccer player who plays as a defensive midfielder for Major League Soccer club CF Montréal and the Canada national team.

Club career

Early career
Piette began playing soccer at age four with local club Lionceaux de Le Gardeur and later joined Olympique de Repentigny and FC Boisbriand. In 2009, he moved to Europe and joined the youth team of Metz but after French football rules, which state that a player must be 18 to sign a contract with a club, Piette joined Bundesliga youth side Fortuna Düsseldorf on 26 June 2012.

Fortuna Düsseldorf
After continuing to play for Fortuna Düsseldorf II Piette made his senior debut as a second-half substitute for Erwin Hoffer on 4 April 2014 in a 2–1 victory over SC Paderborn.

Deportivo La Coruña
On 25 August 2014, Piette signed a one-year deal with Deportivo de La Coruña, being assigned to the reserves in Tercera División. After overcoming fitness issues, Piette made his league debut against Bertamiráns on 30 November.

Loan to Racing de Ferrol 
Piette was loaned to Racing de Ferrol for the 2015–16 season on 7 August 2015.

Izarra
After terminating his contract with Deportivo on 15 July 2016, Piette signed with Segunda División B club CD Izarra the following day.

CF Montréal
On 3 August 2017, Piette returned to Canada to sign with Montreal Impact, later renamed CF Montréal, of Major League Soccer, citing a desire to play in his hometown. He made his debut for the club on 12 August in a 3–0 win over Philadelphia Union, earning rave reviews, as well as a place in the MLS team of the week. Piette had his option for the 2020 season exercised by the Impact, keeping him with the club for 2020. Shortly after, he signed a three-year extension with the Impact keeping him with the club through the 2022 season, with an option for the 2023 season. After the 2022 season, Piette would sign a new contract with CF Montréal through the end of the 2025 season, with an option for 2026.

International career

Youth teams
Piette played for the Canada U17 national team, making his debut in the qualifiers for the 2011 FIFA U-17 World Cup. His team would go on to qualify for the tournament. Piette was also a part of the Canada U23 side, that attempted to qualify for the 2012 Olympics Football tournament, earning three caps. The team did not qualify for London 2012.

Senior team
Piette was called up to the Canada senior team for the first time for a friendly against Armenia in mid February but failed to see the pitch. He made his senior international debut on 3 June 2012, coming on as an 85th-minute substitute for Julian De Guzman in a 0–0 draw with the United States at BMO Field. This cap made Piette the third youngest player to ever suit up for the Canadian senior side. On 27 June 2013, he was listed as a part of the confirmed 23-man squad for Colin Miller's Canada squad for 2013 CONCACAF Gold Cup.

Piette was called up for the 2015 CONCACAF Gold Cup by Benito Floro in June 2015, as well as the 2017 CONCACAF Gold Cup by Octavio Zambrano. He earned rave reviews for his performance in the 2017 CONCACAF Gold Cup, particularly during group stage matches against Costa Rica and Honduras.

On 30 May 2019, Piette was named to the Canadian squad for the 2019 CONCACAF Gold Cup. On 1 July 2021, he was called up to Canada for the 2021 CONCACAF Gold Cup

In November 2022, Piette was named to Canada's 26-man squad for the 2022 FIFA World Cup.

Career statistics

Club

International

Honours
Montreal Impact
 Canadian Championship: 2019, 2021
Individual
 QSF Male Professional Player of the Year: 2018
QSF Male Senior Player of the Year: 2011, 2015
QSF Male Youth Player of the Year: 2010, 2012

References

External links

1994 births
Living people
People from Repentigny, Quebec
Soccer people from Quebec
Canadian soccer players
Association football midfielders
FC Metz players
Fortuna Düsseldorf II players
Fortuna Düsseldorf players
Deportivo Fabril players
Racing de Ferrol footballers
CD Izarra footballers
CF Montréal players
Regionalliga players
2. Bundesliga players
Tercera División players
Segunda División B players
Major League Soccer players
Canada men's youth international soccer players
Canada men's under-23 international soccer players
Canada men's international soccer players
2013 CONCACAF Gold Cup players
2015 CONCACAF Gold Cup players
2017 CONCACAF Gold Cup players
2019 CONCACAF Gold Cup players
2021 CONCACAF Gold Cup players
Canadian expatriate soccer players
Expatriate footballers in France
Expatriate footballers in Germany
Expatriate footballers in Spain
Expatriate soccer players in the United States
Canadian expatriate sportspeople in France
Canadian expatriate sportspeople in Germany
Canadian expatriate sportspeople in Spain
Canadian expatriate sportspeople in the United States
FC Boisbriand players
2022 FIFA World Cup players